Admiral Ferguson may refer to:

George Ferguson (Royal Navy officer) (1788–1867), British Royal Navy admiral
John Macpherson Ferguson (1783–1855), British Royal Navy rear admiral
Mark E. Ferguson III (born 1956), U.S. Navy admiral

See also
James Fergusson (Royal Navy officer) (1871–1942), British Royal Navy admiral